Patrick Cole (born May 19, 1993) is an American basketball player. He competed in college for Coppin State, Siena, and North Carolina Central.

Early life and high school career
Cole is the son of  Patrick Brinson and Denise Cole and grew up in Newark, New Jersey. As a child, his favorite sport was soccer, although he developed an interest in basketball later. In his senior year at Newark Central High School, he led the team to the Group II state championship. Cole averaged 11.2 points per game and received All-Essex County honors.

College career
Cole began his college career at Coppin State, where he averaged 10.3 points, 2.8 rebounds and 2.2 assists per game. He was named to the MEAC All-Rookie team but opted to transfer to Siena. He only played seven games for the Saints and averaged 8.4 points, 2.7 rebounds and 1.9 assists per game. On December 19, 2014, Siena Coach Jimmy Patsos announced that Cole was suspended from the team indefinitely.

Cole transferred again, to North Carolina Central and finished second on the team in scoring as a junior with a 14.4 points per game average, to go along with 4.5 rebounds and 3.2 assists per game. In his senior year, Cole averaged 19.6 points and 5.8 assists per game. He recorded North Carolina Central's first triple-double in the Division I era, with 14 points, 12 rebounds and 10 assists against Jackson State. He had a season-high 32 points in a win over Northern Kentucky. He was named MEAC Player of the Year on March 3, 2017. Cole earned most valuable player honors of the 2017 MEAC men's basketball tournament after contributing 18 points and eight rebounds in a victory over Norfolk State in the championship game.

References

External links
 Patrick Cole at CBS Sports.com

1993 births
Living people
American expatriate basketball people in Kosovo
American men's basketball players
Basketball players from Newark, New Jersey
Central High School (Newark, New Jersey) alumni
Coppin State Eagles men's basketball players
KB Prishtina players
North Carolina Central Eagles men's basketball players
Shooting guards
Siena Saints men's basketball players